Democratic Renovation Party may refer to:

 Democratic Renovation Party (Cape Verde)
 Democratic Renovation Party (São Tomé and Príncipe)

See also
 Democratic Renewal Party (disambiguation)